is a Japanese ice hockey player and member of the Japanese national ice hockey team, currently playing with Linköping HC Dam of the Swedish Women's Hockey League (SDHL). She has played with the Seibu Princess Rabbits of the Women's Japan Ice Hockey League (WJIHL) and All-Japan Women's Ice Hockey Championship. 

With Team Japan, she participated in the 2015 IIHF Women's World Championship and at the 2018 Winter Olympics.

Her older sister, Ayaka, is also an ice hockey player.

References

External links

1997 births
Living people
Ice hockey players at the 2018 Winter Olympics
Ice hockey players at the 2022 Winter Olympics
Japanese women's ice hockey forwards
Olympic ice hockey players of Japan
Sportspeople from Hokkaido
Asian Games medalists in ice hockey
Asian Games gold medalists for Japan
Ice hockey players at the 2017 Asian Winter Games
Medalists at the 2017 Asian Winter Games
Japanese expatriate ice hockey people
Linköping HC Dam players